Federico Morlacchi (born 11 November 1993) is an Italian paralympic swimmer who was flagbearer for Italy at the 2020 Summer Paralympics open ceremony ensemble with Bebe Vio.

Biography
He is boyfriend of the Italian paralympic swimmer Giulia Ghiretti. He won 18 medals at the World Para Swimming Championships and 20 at the IPC Swimming European Championships.

Achievements

See also
Italy at the 2012 Summer Paralympics
Italy at the 2016 Summer Paralympics
Italy at the 2020 Summer Paralympics

Notes

References

External links
 
 Federico Morlacchi at Comitato Italiano Paralimpico

1993 births
Living people
Italian male medley swimmers
Paralympic swimmers of Italy
Paralympic gold medalists for Italy
Paralympic silver medalists for Italy
Paralympic bronze medalists for Italy
S9-classified Paralympic swimmers
Medalists at the 2012 Summer Paralympics
Medalists at the 2016 Summer Paralympics
Medalists at the 2020 Summer Paralympics
Medalists at the World Para Swimming Championships
Medalists at the World Para Swimming European Championships
Paralympic medalists in swimming
Swimmers at the 2012 Summer Paralympics
Swimmers at the 2016 Summer Paralympics
Swimmers at the 2020 Summer Paralympics
Italian male freestyle swimmers
Italian male butterfly swimmers
20th-century Italian people
21st-century Italian people